Çağla Büyükakçay was the defending champion, but lost in the quarterfinals to Elise Mertens.

Elina Svitolina won the title, defeating Mertens in the final, 6–2, 6–4.

Seeds

Draw

Finals

Top half

Bottom half

Qualifying

Seeds

Qualifiers

Lucky losers
  Anna Kalinskaya

Draw

First qualifier

Second qualifier

Third qualifier

Fourth qualifier

Fifth qualifier

Sixth qualifier

References
 Main Draw
 Qualifying Draw

2017 in Istanbul
2017 in Turkish tennis
Istanbul Cup - Singles
İstanbul Cup
Istan